National Aboriginal and Torres Strait Islander Sports Awards were first held in 1986 and recognize the sporting achievements of Indigenous and Islander athletes. The Awards have not been held since 2003.

Background

The inaugural National Aboriginal and Torres Strait Islander Sports Awards were held at Adelaide's Hilton International Hotel on 6 September 1986.  The Awards were established to pay tribute to the contribution of Aboriginal men and women to Australian and international sport. Charlie Perkins, Secretary of the Department of Aboriginal Affairs, strongly supported the establishment of the Awards and obtained Australian Government funding.  The Aboriginal and Torres Strait Islander Commission continued funding after the Department ceased to exist. Australian business also assisted with sponsorship.

Sydney Jackson, a champion Australian rules footballer and sports administrator made the following statements regarding the establishment of the Awards:  the most exciting thing that has happened in Aboriginal sport outside individual achievement and recognition of Aboriginal sports men and women will go a long way towards encouraging you Aboriginal athletes to preserve in the development of their natural talents.  Clyde Holding, the Minister of Aboriginal Affairs stated at the inaugural Awards that   'formal recognition of the big contribution made to Australian sport by Aboriginals is long overdue. 

The inaugural Awards aimed to be a gala event replicating the ABC Sports Award of the Year and Australian Sport Awards ceremonies. Due to the costs of holding the Awards, it was proposed to hold them every two years. Until 2003 the Awards were televised by either SBS or the  ABC. Award ceremonies generally included performances by talented Aboriginal performers. David Gulpilil danced at the inaugural Awards.

Location and Dates

Winners

1st 1986
The inaugural Awards recognized a high number of former Aboriginal athletes. It was reported that never before had so many Aboriginal sporting champions congregated in one place. At the Awards, Evonne Goolagong Cawley received her Sport Australia Hall of Fame gold medallion. She joined Lionel Rose and Polly Farmer as the only Aboriginal members of the Hall of Fame in 1986.

National Sportswomen - Evonne Goolagong Cawley (Tennis)
National Sportsman - Lionel Rose (Boxing)
National Junior Sportswomen - Treahna Hamm (Judo)
National Junior Sportsman - David Ross (AFL)
Alma Thorpe Victorian Health Service Fitzroy All Stars Football Club
 State Awards - 
ACT Awards - Wally Austin (AFL), Delma Smith (Volleyball), Harry Williams (Soccer), Percy Knight (Rugby league), Neil Bulger (Cricket), Bob Huddleston (Boxing), Benny Mills (Basketball), Joanne Leisputty (Softball), Neil Harwood (Basketball)
NSW Awards - Peter Cooley (Surfing), Larry Corowa (Rugby league),  Mark Ella (Rugby union), Marcia Ella (Netball), Evonne Goolagong Cawley (Tennis), Jack Hassan (Boxing), Felicity Huntington (Field hockey), Peter Kirby, Lee Madden (Tennis), Tony Mundine (Boxing), Eric Simms (Rugby league)
NT - Phynea Clarke (Field hockey), Louisa Collins (Netball), Rose Damaso (Basketball/Netball), Bill Dempsey (AFL), Brian Dixon (Basketball/Baseball), Ivy Hampton (Darts), Ricky Peterson (Boxing), Bill Roe (AFL), Maurice Rioli (AFL), David Ross (AFL), Horrie Seden (Darts)
QLD - Arthur Beetson (Rugby league), Andrea Collins (Basketball), Jeffrey Dynevor (Boxing), Darby McCarthy (Horse racing), Ian King, Warren Lawton (Paralympic athletics), Andrea Mason (Netball), Lionel Morgan (Rugby league),  Danny Morseu (Basketball), Doug Sam (Boxing), Hector Thompson (Boxing), Priscilla West (Basketball)
SA - Laura Agius (Netball), Bert Clark (administration), Michael Graham (AFL), Ken Hampton (Athletics), Walter Macathur (Athletics, Rugby league), Sonny Morey (AFL), John Kundereri Moriarty (soccer),  Roger Rigney (AFL), Jim Stanley (Boxing), Faith Thomas (Cricket), Don Tschuna (AFL), Mark Tutton (Volleyball), Keith Warrior (AFL)
TAS - Erica Bartlett (Netball), Roger Brown (Cricket), Leonie Dickson (Netball/Basketball), Beverly Dillon (Netball), Greg Lovell (Woodchopping), Brian Mansell (Cycling),  Doug Maynard (AFL), Maureen Stafford (Netball), Carl Thomas (Boxing),  Brian Thomas (Judo)
VIC - Tony Briggs (Athletics), Graeme Brooke (Boxing), Kevin Coombs (Paralympic basketball), Treahna Hamm (Judo), Syd Jackson (AFL), Glenn James (AFL), Gundy James (Golf), Norm McDonald, Lionel Rose, Alma Thorpe (administration), Kyle Vander Kuyp (Athletics)
WA - May Chalker (Golf), Mark Chalker (Golf), Polly Farmer (AFL), Jim Krakouer (AFL), Phil Krakouer (AFL),  Ted Kilmurray (AFL), Irwin Lewis (AFL), Stephen Michael (AFL),  Lorraine Pindan (Athletics)

2nd 1988
National Sportswomen - Cheryl Drayton (Badminton)
National Sportsman - Tony Jones (Boxing) 
National Junior Sportswomen -  Majorie Patrick (Vision impaired Swimming/Athletics) 
National Junior Sportsman - Darryl Hiles (Boxing)
National Sports Official of the Year -  Redfern All Blacks
Special Recognition Awards - Bob Bloomfield (AFL) and Eunice Peachey (Dubbo Pacemakers Club)

3rd 1991 
National Sportswomen - Cathy Freeman (Athletics)
National Sportsman - Karl Feifar (Paralympic Athletics)
National Junior Sportswomen - Toni Gableish 
National Junior Sportsman -  Matthew AhMat (AFL)
National Sports Official of the Year - Steve Cubillo (Basketball)

4th 1993 
National Sportswomen - Donna Burns (Paralympic Basketball)
National Sportsman - Gavin Wanganeen (AFL)
National Junior Sportswomen - Syripa Macer (Judo) 
National Junior Sportsman - Lachlan Wright (Soccer, Rugby league, Surf life saving)
National Sports Official of the Year - Maisie Austin (Basketball)
Special Achiever Awards - ACT - Caine George (Basketball); NSW - Natalie Bell (Soccer); NT - Bernie Devine (Powerlifting); QLD - Lorelle Morrissey (Field hockey); SA - Anthony Drover (Soccer); TAS - Sean Gower (Indoor cricket); VIC - Gundy James (Golf); WA - John McGuire (Cricket)

5th 1995 
National Sportswomen - Cathy Freeman (Athletics)
National Sportsman - Kyle Vander-Kuyp (Athletics)  
National Junior Sportswomen - Helena Saunders (Netball) 
National Junior Sportsman - Joshua Ugle (Karate and Badminton)
National Coach of the Year - Patsy Elarde (Basketball)
National Sports Official of the Year -  Hyacinth Tungutalum (AFL)
National Special Achiever Awards - Eddie Gilbert (Cricket) and May Chalker (Golf)
State Achievers Award - ACT Percy Knight (Rugby league); NSW - Kevin Hamilton (Basketball); NT - Nova Peris (Field hockey); QLD - Steve Renouf (Rugby league); SA - Michael Graham; TAS - Lawrie Lowery (Boxing, Running and Swimming); VIC - Glenn James (AFL); WA - Bill Dempsey (AFL)

6th 1997 
National Sportswomen - Cathy Freeman (Athletics)
National Sportsman - Baeden Choppy (Field hockey)
National Junior Sportswomen - Rohanee Cox (Basketball) 
National Junior Sportsman - Anthony Martin (Weightlifting)
National Disabled Sportswoman of the Year -  Syripa Macer (Karate)
National Disabled Sportsman of the Year - Lee Towers (Basketball) 
National Coach of the Year -  Maisie Austin (Basketball)
National Sports Official of the Year - Gerard 'Jacko' Whitby (Athletics)
National Sports Innovation Award -  Palawa Recreation Program
State Achiever Awards - ACT - Katrina Fanning (Rugby league); NSW - Scott Gardiner (Golf); NT - Graeme Smith (AFL); QLD - Michael Viti (Touch football ); SA - Lindsay Bassani (AFL ); TAS - Grant Brown (Boxing); VIC - Kamahl Lord (BMX ); WA - Shane Hearn (Athletics)
Special Tribute Award - Charlie Perkins for administration of indigenous role and achievements as a soccer player.
Special Contribution Awards - Bill and Maley Hayward (AFL) and Joy Cardona (AFL umpire)

7th 1999 
National Sportswomen - Cathy Freeman (athletics)
National Sportsman - Nicky Winmar (AFL) / Cliff Lyons (Rugby league)
National Junior Sportswomen - Kelly Denner (Swimming) 
National Junior Sportsman - Ashley Anderson (Swimming) 
National Disabled Sportswoman of the Year - Beverley Champion  (Athletics)
National Disabled Sportsman of the Year - Ashley Pardon (Athletics)
National Coach of the Year - John Roe (American football)
National Sports Official of the Year - Scott Butler (Basketball) 
National Sports Innovation Award - Croc Eisteddfod 
National Sports Writers Award  - Lionel Rose for his unforgettable victory against Fighting Harada in Tokyo during 1968.
Outstanding Contributions by Older Persons - George Bracken and Faith Thomas
Outstanding Contributions to Indigenous Sports -  Danny Morseu and Andrea Collins

8th 2001 
National Sportswomen - Cathy Freeman (Athletics)
National Sportsman - Jason Gillespie (Cricket) / Andrew McLeod (AFL)
National Junior Sportswomen -  Suellyn Hayes (Wrestling)
National JUnior Sportsman -  Fred Agius (Soccer)
National Disabled Sportswoman of the Year - Christine Maynard (Basketball)
National Disabled Sportsman of the Year - Warren Lawton (Athletics)
National Coach of the Year - Edward Boyd Scully (Boxing)
National Sports Official of the Year - Marmingee Hand
International Volunteers Award - Joseph Donovan
Dr Charles Perkins Award - Michael Long (AFL) / Anthony Mundine (Boxing)
State Achievers - ACT - Bruce Martin (Water polo) ; NSW - Kevin Bloomfield (Field hockey), James McAllister (Sailing); NT - Bo Delacruz (Touch football) ; SA - Tim Ewen (Athletics) ;  VIC -  Barry Firebrace (Cricket) ; QLD - Jade Casey (Diving) ; TAS - Phillip Marshall (Field hockey) ; WA - : Beau Anderson (Darts) ;

9th 2003 
National Sportswomen - Bo De La Cruz (Touch football)
National Sportsman - Anthony Mundine (Boxing)
National Junior Sportswomen - Kathleen Logue (Darts)
National Junior Sportsman - Kyle Anderson (Darts) 
National Disabled Sportswoman of the Year - Tegan Blanch (Tennis/Swimming/Athletics)
National Disabled Sportsman of the Year - Troy Murphy (Ten pin bowling)
National Coach of the Year - John Roe (American football)
National Sports Official of the Year - Stacey Campton (Netball)
Dr Charles Perkins Award - Cathy Freeman (Athletics) / Kyle Vander Kuyp (Athletics)
State Achievers - ACT -  Katrina Fanning (Rugby league) ; NSW - David Peachey (Rugby league) ; NT - Sarrita King  (Netball) ; QLD - Ashley Anderson (Swimming) ; SA - Joseph Milera (AFL) ; TAS - Nathan Polley (Boxing) ; VIC - Mungara Brown (AFL) ; WA - Bianca Franklin (Netball)

See also

Aboriginal and Islander Sports Hall of Fame

References

Australian sports trophies and awards
Awards honoring indigenous people
Indigenous Australian sport